Mžany is a municipality and village in Hradec Králové District in the Hradec Králové Region of the Czech Republic. It has about 400 inhabitants.

Administrative parts
Villages of Dub and Stračovská Lhota are administrative parts of Mžany.

References

External links

Villages in Hradec Králové District